The men's road race at the 1954 UCI Road World Championships was the 21st edition of the event. The race took place on Sunday 22 August 1954 in Solingen, West Germany. The race was won by Louison Bobet of France.

Final classification

References

Men's Road Race
UCI Road World Championships – Men's road race